Isaac Israel Hayes (March 5, 1832 – December 17, 1881) was an American Arctic explorer, physician, and politician, who was appointed as the commanding officer at Satterlee General Hospital during the American Civil War, and was then elected, after the war, to the New York State Assembly.

In 1863, Hayes was elected as a member to the American Philosophical Society.

His book, The Open Polar Sea: A Narrative of a Voyage of Discovery towards the North Pole, in the Schooner United States, was published in 1867.

Formative years and Arctic exploration
Born in Chester County, Pennsylvania on March 5, 1832, Hayes was raised on his family's farm before being sent to the coeducational Westtown School, which had been founded in Chester County in 1799 by the Religious Society of Friends (Quakers). Electing to remain there for two years following his graduation, he became an assistant teacher of civil engineering and mathematics. In 1851, he sought and received admission to the University of Pennsylvania Medical School. After graduating from Penn a year ahead of schedule, he then signed on as ship's surgeon for the Second Grinnell Expedition of 1853–1855. Led by Elisha Kane, the project's members left New York harbor in June 1853 in search of Franklin's lost expedition.

While still engaged with Kane's expedition, Hayes and another team member succeeded in making a round trip exploration of the east coast of Ellesmere Island north of the 79th parallel (79° north). When Kane announced his plans to extend the expedition for a second winter even though the group's food and fuel were severely depleted, Hayes and seven other team members opted to head south for what they thought would be safety. Instead, they ran out of food and began to eat the only available food source — lichen — until forced to return to Kane's main group, where Hayes then underwent the amputation of three of his frostbitten toes before Kane ordered the group to head to Greenland via sledge and boat. After reaching New York in October 1855 and recuperating from the ordeal, Hayes then embarked on a lecture tour, speaking before audiences at the American Geographical Society and Smithsonian Institution and eventually becoming "the most prolific lecturer and writer on the Arctic in the nineteenth century," according to biographer Douglas Wamsley.

American Arctic Expedition

Hayes led his own Arctic expedition from 1860 to 1861 and was able to raise $30,000 for his venture. Departing in June 1860 aboard the United States, he ultimately hoped to reach the North Pole. After arriving in Greenland, he encouraged several Eskimos to join his 20-man party as hunters to ensure that his crew would not be forced to endure the hunger and starvation experienced by previous expeditions. Hayes and his men then set out for Baffin Bay, Smith Sound and Ellesmere Island en route to the Open Polar Sea but, like others before him, was eventually forced by the terrain, harsh climate and dwindling food supplies to turn back. Taking a measurement with his sextant before making the turnaround, he recorded that he and his men had reached 81°35' north, 70°30' west — which, if his measurement was accurate, would have meant that he and his men had reached the farthest point north to date of any polar expedition.

Believing that they had achieved at least part of their objectives, Hayes and his team reached Greenland only to learn that their nation had descended into Civil War.

American Civil War
 After returning to the United States, Hayes enrolled as a surgeon with the Union Army. In 1862, he was placed in command of the Satterlee General Hospital, a sprawling 4,500-bed military hospital in Philadelphia which saw spikes in patients following the Second Battle of Bull Run and Battle of Gettysburg, the latter of which was responsible for "swelling the hospital population to more than 6,000" after "the greatest number of wounded were admitted to the hospital in a single month" during the summer of 1863.

Rendering care to as many as 50,000 sick and wounded during the time this hospital was open, the physicians and nurses under Hayes lost only 260 patients between the time of the hospital's opening and closure, a significant achievement when considering the challenges they faced in treating not only the sheer volume of patients they were required to process, but in doing so while employing relatively rudimentary medical care procedures and sanitation practices.

Post-war life
After the war, Hayes penned a book about his expedition days, The Open Polar Sea: A Narrative of a Voyage of Discovery towards the North Pole, in the Schooner United States. He then followed up with the publication of other work, including 1869's Cast Away in the Cold. On November 23, 1874, a reception was held in Hayes' honor at the Arcadian Club during which General Roy Stone spoke about Hayes' accomplishments.

Publications
 Hayes, Isaac Israel. The Open Polar Sea: A Narrative of a Voyage of Discovery towards the North Pole, in the Schooner United States." Cambridge, United Kingdom: Cambridge University Press, 2013 (original publication year: 1867). 
 Hayes, I. I. Cast Away in the Cold. Gloucester, Gloucestershire, United Kingdom: Dodo Press, 2009 (original publication year: 1869).

Service in the New York State Assembly
Hayes then ran for, and was elected to the New York State Assembly. Representing New York City as a Republican from 1876 until 1881, he worked to improve the quality of life for poor and mentally ill members of society, and joined his fellow State Assembly members, the Hon. Harvey J. Hurd of Erie, and the Hon. Thomas J. Alvord of Onondaga, in proposing an amendment to the New York State Constitution on February 27, 1878 to abolish canal tolls as a way of facilitating business growth and general prosperity in the region.

An "anti-Tammany Hall Republican," he also secured the support of his colleagues in funding construction of a tunnel beneath the Hudson River which, when completed roughly a decade later as the Hudson River Tunnel, significantly improved the efficiency of East Coast transportation by linking Manhattan to New Jersey.

Death and interment
On Friday evening, December 18, 1881, while still a sitting member of the State Assembly, the 49-year-old Hayes suffered a heart attack at his home in New York City. Following his death there the following morning, his remains were returned to Pennsylvania, and were interred at the Oakland Friends Cemetery in West Chester, Pennsylvania.

Honors
 In 1865, Hayes' expedition was memorialized in Frederic Edwin Church's painting Aurora Borealis. During his expedition, Hayes had named a 2,540-foot (774 m) peak at 81°16'N, 65°35'W "Church's Peak" after his friend Church, and gave his own sketch of it (now in the collection of Olana State Historic Site) to the artist; Church used it as a reference for the peak that appears in his Aurora Borealis, and painted Hayes' ship United States in the foreground. Church also produced a portrait oil sketch of Oosisoak, Hayes' lead sled dog, in 1861 (now in a private collection).

In addition to Hayes' commemoration of his expedition by naming the range on Canada's Ellesmere Island after his ship, the United States, one of Russia's Franz Josef Land's islands, Heiss Island (a German cartographer's transliteration of Hayes Island) was also named in his honor.

References

Further reading 
 Johnson, Robert E. Hayes, Isaac Israel in Dictionary of Canadian Biography, 11, University of Toronto/Université Laval, 2003
 Robinson, Michael The Coldest Crucible: Arctic Exploration and American Culture (University of Chicago Press, 2006)
 Wamsley, Douglas W. Polar Hayes: The Life and Contributions of Isaac Israel Hayes, M.D, (American Philosophical Society Press, 2009)

External links 

 Isaac I. Hayes Papers (Ms. Coll. 135). West Chester, Pennsylvania: Chester County Historical Society, retrieved online February 20, 2019.
 
 
 
 Biography at the Dictionary of Canadian Biography Online
 Hayes' 1860–1861 backers, data, alterations, maps, picture of farthest
 The Papers of Isaac Israel Hayes at Dartmouth College Library

1832 births
1881 deaths
People from Chester County, Pennsylvania
American explorers
Explorers of the Arctic
Perelman School of Medicine at the University of Pennsylvania alumni
Republican Party members of the New York State Assembly
Physicians from New York City
19th-century American politicians
Politicians from New York City
Westtown School alumni